The Fragile Tour was a concert tour by progressive rock band Yes in promotion of their 1971 album, Fragile. Lasting from 24 September 1971 until 27 March 1972, and including 115 performances, the tour began at the Queen's Hall in Barnstaple, Devon, and ended at the Aquarius Theatre in Boston, Massachusetts—Bill Bruford's last performance with the band before returning for 1991's Union.  The tour was Rick Wakeman's first with the band; sources differ as to whether his first live appearance with the band was on 24 September at the Queen's Hall in Barnstaple, or on 30 September—the third tour date—at Leicester's De Montfort Hall.

Recordings 
Three songs from the tour (from unknown dates)—"Perpetual Change", "Long Distance Runaround", and "The Fish (Schindleria Praematurus)"—were included on the band's 1973 live album, Yessongs.

The band's 3 October 1971 performance at the Hemel Hempstead Pavilion was recorded for television broadcast on BBC's Sounding Out.  The recording was broadcast on 10 January 1972, shortly before the commencement of the second European leg of the tour.

Members 
The line-up for the tour unchanged throughout its duration, though sources are contradictory as to whether Wakeman was present for the first two concerts.  The line-up was the sixth incarnation of Yes. Rick Wakeman had joined the band the previous month, spending August and early September in recording sessions for Fragile at London's Advision Studios.

 Jon Anderson—lead vocal
 Steve Howe—guitars
 Chris Squire—bass guitar and vocals
 Rick Wakeman—keyboards
 Bill Bruford—drums

Tour 
The tour saw the band play a total of 111 concerts in the United Kingdom, the Netherlands, the United States, and Belgium over four legs—two European legs and two North American legs.

Support came from Jonathan Swift, Ten Years After, Mary Wells, Emerson, Lake and Palmer, The J. Geils Band, King Crimson, The Blues Project, and Shawn Phillips. At a 16 March 1972 concert in Tucson, Arizona, the band supported Black Sabbath.

 Setlist 
Setlist:

 "Roundabout" (Anderson, Howe)
 "I've Seen All Good People" (Anderson, Squire)
 "Mood for a Day" (Howe)
 "Clap" (Howe)
 "Heart of the Sunrise" (Anderson, Squire, Bruford)
 Wakeman solo (Rick Wakeman)
 "Long Distance Runaround" (Anderson)
 "The Fish (Schindleria Praematurus)" (Squire)
 "Perpetual Change" (Anderson, Squire)
 "Yours Is No Disgrace" (Anderson, Squire, Howe, Kaye, Bruford)
 "South Side of the Sky" (only occasionally after 2 October 1971) (Anderson, Squire)

 Tour dates 

 Cancelled shows 
Wilkinson (2003) lists only three shows from the tour as being cancelled.  The first, on 9 October 1971 at the Edinburgh Empire Theatre, was cancelled after the PA system failed to arrive at the venue.  A newspaper story at the time reported that the equipment van, travelling to Scotland from the Royal Festival Hall from the previous evening's concert, broke down in Birmingham.  Similarly, two replacement vans also broke down.  The band rescheduled the date for 23 October, with original tickets still valid.  The band offered free posters to fans attending the 23 October show.

The second appearance to be cancelled was on 2 November at the Oakland Coliseum in Oakland, California—the first show of the tour's North American leg.  The concert was cancelled as the band's PA system was stolen.

Other sources state that it was the 8 November show at the San Francisco Winterland Ballroom that was cancelled due to the stolen PA system, implying that the band appeared that night at the Oakland Coliseum (with a rented sound system) instead. The concert in Richmond VA on 3 March 1972, was also cancelled, and supposedly the band played at the TownshipAuditorium in Columbia S Carolina instead. Additionally, reports exist of a show on 29 October in Rotterdam, Netherlands, that was also cancelled.

References 

1971 concert tours
1972 concert tours
Yes (band) concert tours